Peter Karl Holmesland (24 June 1866 - 1933) was a Norwegian jurist and politician for the Liberal Party.

Born in Holme as the son of former parliament member Simon Pedersen Holmesland, he enrolled as a student in 1884, graduated as cand.jur. in 1889 and started working as an attorney. In 1892 he was a clerk for Statistics Norway and the Ministry of Finance. He became acting stipendiary magistrate (byfoged) in Larvik in 1899, and district stipendiary magistrate (sorenskriver) in Gjerpen in 1909. Gjerpen district comprised Gjerpen, Porsgrund, Slemdal, Solum and Holla. Holmesland stayed in this position until his death in 1933.

From 1901 to 1904 he had been a member of Larvik city council. He was elected to the Norwegian Parliament in 1913, representing the urban constituency of Porsgrund. He served only one three-year term.

He married Gunhild Løvrak, and their son Eilif Løvrak Holmesland became a jurist and politician too.

References

1866 births
1933 deaths
Members of the Storting
Liberal Party (Norway) politicians
Politicians from Telemark
People from Larvik
Politicians from Porsgrunn
Norwegian jurists